Open enrollment may refer to:

 Annual enrollment, a period of starting insurance in the United States
 Open admissions, a college admissions policy in the United States
 A form of school choice in various countries